X is a Dutch demoscene party held in Someren, organized by the demoscene groups Success & The Ruling Company (SCS*TRC), Xenon, and Silicon Ltd. With about 250 visitors, it is the world's largest Commodore 64 demoscene party, attracting demosceners from around the world. 

X started in 1995 in Utrecht, initially focusing on both the Commodore 64 and PC demoscenes before switching to focus solely on the Commodore 64 in 1998.

History 

X evolved from the three successful parties held by Silicon Ltd between 1991 and 1993. After the third party in 1993, several Silicon Ltd members who helped organize the parties left the group, and a few of these ex-members formed a PC group under the name SuccesS PC in December 1993. At the same time, the groups SuccesS and The Ruling Company formed a co-operation.

In 1995, SCS*TRC, SuccesS PC, and a third group, Focus, decided to organize a combined party for the C64 and the evolving PC demoscenes in Utrecht, where the former Silicon Ltd parties were held. The party, X’95, was a success, and another X party was held in 1996. In 1997, the X organizers combined their efforts with another PC group and expanded to a bigger venue at the Eindhoven University of Technology. With access to a large party hall, an auditorium, professional audio/video equipment, and unlimited internet access, they organized one of the first large LAN parties in The Netherlands.

Although X'97 was an overall success, the increased scale of the party had its downsides. Many C64 demosceners expressed that they missed a cozier atmosphere that was present at the previous smaller X parties. In addition, quarrels with other PC groups led to the dissolution of SuccesS PC. As a result of this, SCS*TRC (in particular, members Burglar, CBA, Moren, and Nightshade) decided to make the next X party in 1998 focus exclusively on the C64 demoscene. The C64 group Xenon was also enlisted to help organize the party. After picking a new location at a farm in Ruurlo, an "all-inclusive" concept was invented that formed the basis for all X parties that followed. X’98 exceeded expectations, with almost 100 people attending.

After two more X parties were held in 2000 and 2001, most of the main organizers started to lose interest in the event, and no parties were held for the next two years. Xenon, still interested in continuing X, teamed up with demosceners Spectator, Oxbow, WVL and CBA to organize another party in 2004. X’2004 ended up being the largest X party to date at the time, partially due to C64 demoscene activity increasing, and got many inactive organizers interested in participating in X again. The SuccesS PC members rejoined the X organizers under their former group name Silicon Ltd, after which the party evolved, becoming more refined and professional while staying non-profit.

Eventually the X party outgrew the location in Ruurlo, and after receiving complaints about noise disturbance, relocated to its current location in Someren which has more space, a basement for musical performances, a professional kitchen, and many beds for guests.

Events 

 X 1995 — A fistfun experience to be seen to be believed! (April 21, 1995 – April 22, 1995)
 X 1996 — (April 5, 1996 – April 7, 1996)
 X 1997 — Takeover (April 4, 1997 – April 6, 1997)
 X 1998 — (September 18, 1998 – September 20, 1998)
 X 2000 — The Reunion (November 17, 2000 – November 19, 2000)
 X 2001 — A C64 Odyssey (November 23, 2001 – November 25, 2001)
 X 2004 — 8 Bit Heaven (October 22, 2004 – October 24, 2004)
 X 2006 — Got Cow ? (October 13, 2006 – October 15, 2006)
 X 2008 — Mooooooooooooohhhhhhhhhhh (October 24, 2008 – October 26, 2008)
 X 2010 — The Year We Make Contact (October 1, 2010 – October 3, 2010)
 X 2012 — (October 26, 2012 – October 28, 2012)
 X 2014 — (October 24, 2014 – October 26, 2014)
 X 2016 — (October 28, 2016 – October 30, 2016)
 X 2018 — (November 2, 2018 – November 4, 2018)
 X 2023 — (June 2, 2023 – June 4, 2023)

Live performances 

 X 1995 — Toadstool
 X 1996 — Toadstool
 X 1997 — Toadstool
 X 2004 — Goto80
 X 2006 — Jeroen Tel & a striptease act
 X 2008 — Reyn Ouwehand & Jeroen Tel
 X 2010 — 6581 Band, Jeroen Tel, DaTucker
 X 2012 — Reyn Ouwehand & Jeroen Tel
 X 2014 — Reyn Ouwehand & Bas Bron
 X 2016 — Reyn Ouwehand & LFT & 64Mula & Jeroen Tel & Wacek
 X 2018 — Reyn Ouwehand & Goto80 & Wacek & Magnar

Competition winners

External links 
 The Digital Dungeon FTP site with C64 Releases from the parties
 Photos from the X Parties and more
 The X Parties on Pouet.net
 Success & The Ruling Company Official Site
 X '95 Pictures on Slengpung
 X '97 TakeOver Pictures on Slengpung
 X 2001 Pictures on Slengpung
 X 2004 Pictures on Slengpung
 The former X Partylocation: Kampeerboerderij De Haverkamp
 The current X Partylocation: De Hoof Groepsaccommodaties

Demo parties
Festivals in the Netherlands

References 
 https://demozoo.org/parties/series/32/